The Handen Murders was the murder of two police officers, Uno Helderud and Lars Birger Wikander, and the night guard Nils Bertil Nilsson in the central part of Handen, Sweden, on 9 January 1967. One man was convicted of the murders: Leif Peters.

Commission of the crime
The two police officers were commissioned to watch a loading bay next to a newly constructed business center in Handen since it was suspected that a gang of thieves would show up. In the close vicinity of the loading bay the two police officers encountered three men of whom they grew suspicious. At first the men claimed to be guards responsible for the stores in Handen Centrum, but then took out a submachine gun and a pistol and killed the police officers along with a guard. In total they fired 34 shots. While the investigation of the crime scene was ongoing the bodies of the victims had to remain on the ground for a couple of days due to technical reasons.

Legal process
The murders were solved one month later when 28-year-old Leif Peters, once an officer cadet, was arrested in Strängnäs, Sweden and pleaded guilty to having fired the shots. On 9 February 1967, the police raided the homes of 16 different people all over Sweden who were suspected of being associated with Peters. The raids uncovered a large gang of thieves of which Peters was the leader. Peters was sentenced to life imprisonment but was transferred to a psychiatric ward a few years later. Peters was never released and died at the age of 68 in July 2006. His two co-conspirators Leif Torver and Leif Wahlström were sentenced to five years imprisonment.

Since both the submachine gun and the pistol had been fired it is likely that more than one person fired the shots. However, only Peters was sentenced for the actual murders since he confessed to having fired all the shots.

References

1967 murders in Sweden
Crimes against police officers in Sweden